Saltersford Wood or Saltersford Valley is a   Local Nature Reserve north-west of Measham in Leicestershire. It is owned and managed by Leicestershire County Council, and it part of The National Forest. The wood is situated  South East of the Saltersford Valley Picnic Area, a twinned Local Nature Reserve also administered by Leicestershire County Council. The two are now separated by Ashby Road and the Donisthorpe Cemetery.

This site has native woodland, hay meadows and areas of open water known as "flashes" with fishing platforms for the disabled. The "flashes" are the result of the flooding of Saltersford Brook caused by mining subsidence causing the nearby Saltersford Brook to flood. There are picnic benches and a car park.

There is access from Measham Road.

References

Local Nature Reserves in Leicestershire